The Bangladesh Financial Intelligence Unit is a government agency of Bangladesh responsible for investigating money laundering, suspicious transactions, and cash transaction reports. The unit works under Bangladesh Bank. Md Masud Biswas is the chief of Bangladesh Financial Intelligence Unit.

History 

The unit was founded as the Anti-Money  Laundering Department of Bangladesh Bank in June 2002. The name of the department was changed to Bangladesh Financial Intelligence Unit on 25 January 2012 through the Money Laundering Prevention Act, 2012. Asia/Pacific Group on Money Laundering recommended the government to form the unit. In 2015, the government of Bangladesh announced plans to provide autonomy to the unit. In 2016, the Bangladesh Bank confirmed the unit has been made autonomous.

In September 2021, the Bangladesh Financial Intelligence Unit sent letters to banks requesting the bank details of 11 elected journalist leaders from Bangladesh Federal Union of Journalists, Dhaka Reporters Unity, Dhaka Union of Journalists, and the National Press Club. The move was condemned by the opposition Bangladesh Nationalist Party who described it as an tactic to scare journalists.

On 24 January 2022, the Bangladesh Financial Intelligence Unit sought account information of Nobel Peace Prize winner Muhammad Yunus, a political opponent of Prime Minister Sheikh Hasina.

References 

2002 establishments in Bangladesh
Bangladeshi intelligence agencies
Organisations based in Dhaka
Finance in Bangladesh
Financial crime prevention
Law enforcement in Bangladesh